The women's 200 metre breaststroke event, included in the swimming competition at the 1960 Summer Olympics, took place on August 26–27, at the Stadio Olimpico del Nuoto. In this event, swimmers covered four lengths of the 50-metre (160 ft) Olympic-sized pool employing the breaststroke. It was the eighth appearance of the event, which first appeared at the 1924 Summer Olympics in Paris. A total of 30 competitors from 19 nations participated in the event. British gold-medalist Anita Lonsbrough became the first swimmer to break the world record in this event, with a time of 2:49.5 in the final.

Records
Prior to this competition, the existing world and Olympic records were:

The following records were established during the competition:

Results

Heats

Final

Sources

References

Women's breaststroke 200 metre
1960 in women's swimming
Women's events at the 1960 Summer Olympics